Khairjhiti (or Kharjiti) is a village in the state of Chhattisgarh in India. Agriculture is the main economic activity. Mungeli is the nearest town.

References 

Villages in Raipur district